Rely is a commune in the Pas-de-Calais department in the Hauts-de-France region of France.

Geography
The A26 autoroute passes by the commune.

History
The village of Rely existed during the Gallo-Roman period and was located on a Roman road,  the  ‘’Chausée (carriageway) Brunehaut’’, that  connected Thérouanne,  Arras and Boulogne-sur-Mer.  
Many villages on or near this Brunehaut road have the same origins, such as Blessy, Estrée-Blanche, Ligny, Auchy-au-Bois and Ferfay. Originally small Roman stations where troops or convoys came to rest and eat on their travels between Rome, Arras, Thérouanne and Boulogne, these stations then developed and became the villages of today. 
The castle, built on a hill surrounded by a wide and deep moat served as a refuge against the successive invasions and plundering of the Normans, Flemish and Spanish armies.
Rely has followed the fate of the volatile Artois region over the centuries:
 In 863 it was part of Flanders.
 In 1180 it became French territory.
 In 1226 it was given to Robert I of Artois, son Louis VIII.
 In 1384 it belonged to Charles the Bold of Burgundy.
 In 1493 it passed to the House of Habsburg.
 In 1640 Artois was reconquered by France, however only a portion of it was returned to France, the other part, which included Rely, stayed in Flanders.
 In 1679, all of the region of Artois was finally ceded to France.

Population

Places of interest
 The church of St.Martin, dating from the sixteenth century.
 The motte and moat of a feudal castle.

See also
Communes of the Pas-de-Calais department

References

Communes of Pas-de-Calais